Balloon Farm is a 1999 television film that stars Rip Torn, Mara Wilson and Laurie Metcalf. It was produced and premiered as part of The Wonderful World of Disney series. It is based on the book Harvey Potter's Balloon Farm by Jerdine Nolen.

Plot
The farming community of Watertown is struggling to survive a severe drought. Harvey Potter (Rip Torn) arrives in the community by renting a farm, which neighbors think is foolish. However, one day young Willow Johnson (Mara Wilson) passes by Potter's field to find his crop is full of magical, colorful balloons. Townspeople, with the exception of Weasel Mayfield (Roberts Blossom), believe that this a good sign that the drought may end soon. When the rough times continue to plague the community, the community turns against Harvey until Willow reminds everyone about the power of faith and the magic that Harvey has brought through the balloons.

Cast
 Rip Torn as Harvey Potter
 Mara Wilson as Willow Johnson
 Laurie Metcalf as Casey Johnson
 Fredric Lane as Jake Johnson
 Roberts Blossom as Weasel Mayfield
 Richard Riehle as Earl
 Ernie Lively as Tom Williams
 Arnetia Walker as Crystal
 Lee Garlington as Maggie
 Guy Boyd as Mayor
 Neal McDonough as Sheriff
 Ken Jenkins as Banker
 Adam Wylie as Charles
 Rudee Lipscomb as Marcy

Home media
The film was released on DVD by Walt Disney Home Video on July 6, 2004. The title was also made available for streaming and download.

References

External links
 
 
 

American children's comedy films
1999 television films
1999 films
Disney television films
American children's films
American television films
Films directed by William Dear
1990s English-language films
1990s American films